Xyloryctes thestalus is a species of rhinoceros beetle in the family Scarabaeidae.

Subspecies
These two subspecies belong to the species Xyloryctes thestalus:
 Xyloryctes thestalus borealis Endrödi, 1975
 Xyloryctes thestalus thestalus Bates, 1888

References

Further reading

 

Dynastinae
Articles created by Qbugbot
Beetles described in 1888